So Long, Stooge (French title: Tchao Pantin) is a 1983 film directed by Claude Berri. It is based on a novel by Alain Page.

Coluche, the lead, won the César Award for Best Actor. The film was selected as the French entry for the Best Foreign Language Film at the 57th Academy Awards, but was not accepted as a nominee.

Plot
Lambert, a withdrawn middle-aged man, works the night shift at a Parisian petrol station. He has no friends, no family; his only companion is his bottle of rum. One night, a young Arab man, Bensoussan, enters his shop — and his life. This stranger has also no family, lives alone in a dingy room, and scrapes together a living as a drug dealer. The two solitary men develop a friendship — but this is brutally brought to an end when Bensoussan is killed in front of Lambert. Lambert soon realises that his new friend was murdered by his drug dealing associates and sets out to avenge his death — assisted by Lola, a punk girl who knew Bensoussan briefly. By doing this, Lambert manages to come to terms with his own tragic past.

Cast
Coluche as Lambert
Richard Anconina as Bensoussan
Agnès Soral as Lola
Philippe Léotard as Bauer
Ahmed Ben Ismaël as Mahmoud

Production

Development 
In 1982, during a train trip, producer Christian Spillmaecker read several novels, including Tchao Pantin by Alain Page, recently published. Spillmaecker was thrilled by the story of Lambert, a depressed former cop turned pump attendant, determined to find the murderers of a small dealer whom he identifies with his son. The producer passed the book to Claude Berri at the last minute. Although not very enthusiastic, Berri saw in Lambert a role for Coluche, with whom he had filmed Le Pistonné and The Schoolmaster (Berri also produced a few films with Coluche) and bought the rights to the novel. He passed the subject to the actor who at first refused such a dark role.

According to Fred Romano, Coluche's partner at the time, the latter "was full of complexes" and did "not want to be caught in a game where he was not in control". However, Coluche facing a large tax debt, signed to play Lambert, but his heart was not in it. Indeed, the actor was going through a bad patch: his wife Véronique left him with their two children and his friend Patrick Dewaere committed suicide with the rifle presented to him by Coluche. Gnawed by remorse and heartache, undermined by debt, Coluche plunged into drugs. This bad patch was going to deepen his portrayal of the character.

The role of young Bensoussan, a small dealer who befriends Lambert, was entrusted to Richard Anconina, then little known to the general public. The role of Lola, a young punk who fell in love with Bensoussan and then Lambert, was given to Agnès Soral, who had filmed under the direction of Berri in A Moment of Distraction. The police officer in charge of the investigation is portrayed by Philippe Léotard.

Filming 
The gas station, which has disappeared since (illuminated with neon, which was suggested by the chief operator Bruno Nuytten), was located rue Pajol, a stone's throw from the La Chapelle metro station The film was also shot in Belleville.

Shot at night in a deliberately gloomy atmosphere, the making of the film was complicated by Coluche whose condition sometimes forces it to be filmed from behind. In addition, the actor did not take off his gas station attendant jacket outside of the shoot. Soral, to blend in with her role, lived the life of a punk and lost weight. The actress, in an interview with Figaro more than thirty years after the film's release, said that she became friendly with Coluche. According to Soral, who was not aware of Coluche's discomfort during the filming, the actors were in pain: besides Coluche, Anconina was coming out of a love affair, just like Léotard, who had just separated from Nathalie Baye, but also Berri who was going through a complicated sentimental episode.

The slap that Coluche gives to Richard Anconina was very real, the latter said in an interview to Europe1. At first, however, Coluche had not dared to hit him hard enough and the latter then asked him to give him a real slap.

The punk concert sequence takes place at the "Gibus" (then called "Le Petit Gibus", described in the film as "a bar of punks at République”), a tiny Parisian concert hall known at the time to be the  CBGB's Parisian. The group that stars in the movie are a famous punk band from the 1980s, "The Horde", and their singer Gogol Premier.

The shots in the infamous districts of the north of Paris went not without a hitch, due to the embarrassment that the film crew caused for petty trafficking, but arrangements were finally made.

Release and reception 

The following week, the film still remained in third place, having been seen by 851,188 admissions since its release, including 417,690 admissions during this period. The week of January 4, 1984, Tchao Pantin climbed to second place behind Rue Barbare, which had just been released, with 383,850 entries, allowing the film to record a total of 1,235,038 entries. The feature film reached 2 million admissions at the start of February 1984. While it was a modest success in cinemas throughout the month of February, Tchao Pantin climbed back to 9th place following his triumph at the Césars in March 1984, which allowed it to get closer to the 2,400,000 entries. The following week it moved up to third place at the box office with 224,565 entries, bringing the total to 2,600,970 entries. Beginning August 1986, the film was still in the top 30 and reached 3.7 million admissions.

In the end, it met with commercial success with 3,829,139 admissions, including 856,133 admissions in Paris, ranking 8th for films with the most admissions in the year of its release.

See also
 List of submissions to the 57th Academy Awards for Best Foreign Language Film
 List of French submissions for the Academy Award for Best Foreign Language Film

References

External links

1983 films
1983 drama films
French drama films
1980s French-language films
Films based on French novels
Films directed by Claude Berri
Films featuring a Best Actor César Award-winning performance
Films featuring a Best Supporting Actor César Award-winning performance
French neo-noir films
Films with screenplays by Claude Berri
1980s French films